In Greek and Roman mythology, Menephron is the name of an Arcadian man notable for his tale surrounding incest. He is only referenced to briefly in the works of Roman authors Ovid and Hyginus.

Mythology 
In Ovid's Metamorphoses, as the runaway Medea flies above Greece in the chariot her grandfather gave her, she passes over Mount Cyllene, where Menephron would incestously lie with his mother in an animal-like manner.

Hyginus in Fabulae confirms that Menephron slept his mother, here named Blias/Bliade, and adds that he also slept with his daughter Cyllene as well.

See also 

 Aegypius
 Epopeus
 Jocasta
 Nyctaea

References

Bibliography 
 
 Hyginus, Gaius Julius, The Myths of Hyginus. Edited and translated by Mary A. Grant, Lawrence: University of Kansas Press, 1960.
 
 
 

Incest in Greek mythology
Arcadian characters in Greek mythology
Metamorphoses characters